Yuen Tsun Tung is a former Hong Kong professional football player and current amateur player for Hong Kong First Division club Wong Tai Sin. Yuen's his twin brother Yuen Tsun Nam is also a footballer and currently plays for Lucky Mile.

Career statistics

Club
 As of 25 December 2016.

References

External links
 
 Yuen Tsun Tung at HKFA

Hong Kong footballers
Fourway Athletics players
Hong Kong Rangers FC players
Hong Kong First Division League players
1991 births
Living people
Association football defenders